David Medina Díaz de López (born 25 July 1982 in Barcelona, Catalonia) is a Spanish professional footballer who plays as a defensive midfielder. He is most notable for playing for Gimnàstic in the Spanish Segunda División.

References

External links

1982 births
Living people
Footballers from Barcelona
Spanish footballers
Association football midfielders
Segunda División players
Segunda División B players
CE Premià players
Gimnàstic de Tarragona footballers
CE Sabadell FC footballers
Racing de Ferrol footballers
CD Tenerife players
CF Reus Deportiu players
Sestao River footballers
CE L'Hospitalet players